The Depraved is a 1957 British crime film.

Plot
Laura is married to drunken, abusive Tom, and begins an affair with U.S. army officer, Dave. She persuades the Captain to help her murder her husband, contriving his death to look like the result of his drunk driving. However, a nosy policeman, Inspector Flynn, becomes suspicious, and soon the lovers' crafty scheme becomes their own nightmare.

Cast
Laura Wilton - Anne Heywood	
Dave Dillon - Robert Arden	
Major Kellaway - Carroll Levis	
Tom Wilton - Basil Dignam	
Inspector Flynn - Denis Shaw	
Colonel-in-chief - Robert Ayres	
Kaufmann - Garry Thorne (as Gary Thorne)	
Barman - Hal Osmond	
Sergeant U.S. Army - Gil Winfield

Critical reception
TV Guide wrote, "the title promises something more lurid than another B murder-mystery with an American leading man, but that's all this is."

References

External links

1957 films
British crime films
1957 crime films
Films shot at New Elstree Studios
1950s English-language films
1950s British films